Tmesiphorini is a tribe of rove beetles.

Genera
 Saltisedes
 Tmesiphorus

References
Wikispecies entry

Beetle tribes
Pselaphitae